Andriy Bachynskyi (11 November 1732 – 19 November 1809) was a Ruthenian Greek Catholic hierarch. He was bishop of the Ruthenian Catholic Eparchy of Mukacheve from 1773 to 1809.

Biography
Born in Beňatina, Habsburg monarchy (present day – Slovakia) in 1732 in the family of the Ruthenian priest Teodor Bachynskyi. He was ordained a priest on 2 September 1756 for the Vicariate Apostolic for Ruthenians by Bishop Manuil Olshavskyi. He was confirmed as the Bishop by the Holy See on 8 March 1773. He was consecrated to the Episcopate on 6 June 1773. The principal consecrator was Bishop Vasilije Božičković and co-consecrators were Bishop Meletie Covaci and Bishop Franz Josef von Gondola. During his episcopacy, in 1777, the bishop's see was transferred from Mukacheve to Uzhgorod.

He died in Uzhgorod on 19 November 1809.

References 

Uzhgorod

1732 births
1809 deaths
18th-century Eastern Catholic bishops
19th-century Eastern Catholic bishops
Bishops of the Uniate Church of the Polish–Lithuanian Commonwealth